Nicolau Colaco (born 16 May 1984) is an Indian footballer who plays as a defender for FC Goa in the Indian Super League, on loan from I-League club Salgaocar.

Career
Colaco played in 14 I-League matches last season including 5 2012 AFC Cup matches for Salgaocar.

International
On 31 July 2012 it was announced that Colaco was selected into the 37 man squad for the India national football team that would play in the 2012 Nehru Cup at the end of August.

Career statistics

Club

References

Indian footballers
1984 births
Living people
I-League players
Salgaocar FC players
Footballers from Goa
Association football defenders